Katterat Station is a railway station in the municipality of Narvik in Nordland county, Norway.  The station is located along the Ofotbanen railway line, between Rombak Station and Søsterbekk Station.

History

The station was built in 1902 and it was originally called Hundalen.
There is no road to Katterat station, the only arrival is by train or by foot. Until the operation of the track was remotely controlled in the 1960s, there was a small, permanent settlement on site.  Today the area is popular for hiking providing cabins and several hiking trails starting at Katterat Station.

References

External links

Narvik
Railway stations on the Ofoten Line
Railway stations in Narvik
Railway stations opened in 1902
1902 establishments in Norway